The 2020 TCU Horned Frogs football team represented Texas Christian University (TCU) during the 2020 NCAA Division I FBS football season. The Horned Frogs competed as a member of the Big 12 Conference and played their home games at Amon G. Carter Stadium on campus in Fort Worth, Texas. They were led by 20th-year head coach Gary Patterson.

In a season impacted by the COVID-19 pandemic, the Horned Frogs compiled a 6–4 record (5–4 in conference). The team was slated to face Arkansas in the Texas Bowl, but had to withdraw due to COVID-19 issues within the program.

Previous season
The Horned Frogs finished the 2019 season with a 5–7 record, 3–6 in Big 12 play, failing to earn bowl eligibility.

Offseason

Coaching changes
In December 2019, co-offensive coordinator and running backs coach Curtis Luper was hired as the offensive coordinator at Missouri. The other co-offensive coordinator, Sonny Cumbie, was promoted to offensive coordinator. Brian Applewhite was hired to fill his role as running backs coach.

Preseason

Big 12 media days
The Big 12 media days were held on July 21–22, 2020 in a virtual format due to the COVID-19 pandemic.

Big 12 media poll

Schedule
TCU released its 2020 schedule on October 22, 2019. The 2020 schedule consists of 6 home games and 6 away games in the regular season. The Horned Frogs will host 1 non-conference game against Prairie View A&M and will travel to non-conference games at California and SMU. TCU will host Oklahoma State, Kansas State, Oklahoma, Iowa State, and Texas Tech and travel to West Virginia, Baylor, Texas, and Kansas in regular season conference play.

The Horned Frogs scheduled games against Cal, Prairie View A&M, were canceled due to the COVID-19 pandemic.

Schedule Source:

Coaching staff

Rankings

Players drafted into the NFL

References

TCU
TCU Horned Frogs football seasons
TCU Horned Frogs football